Alonei Yitzhak (lit. Yitzhak Oaks) is a youth village in northern Israel. Located near Binyamina, it falls under the jurisdiction of Menashe Regional Council.

History
The village was established in 1948 by Yehiel Harif to absorb children who had survived the Holocaust. It was named after Yitzhak Gruenbaum. Today the village is a boarding school that teaches 675 children (275 residential, 400 day students) from 7th to 12th grade.

Alonei Yitzhak nature reserve
A 31-acre nature reserve within which the Village is located was declared in 1969, mainly of old Valonia oak trees (Quercus macrolepis), in close proximity to the youth village. Other flora in the oak forest includes Cyclamen persicum, Calicotome villosa, Ephedra, Sea Squill, and Asphodelus microcarpus.

References

External links
Aloney Yitzchak Youth Village Website 

Youth villages in Israel
Populated places established in 1948
Nature reserves in Israel
Protected areas of Haifa District
Populated places in Haifa District